James Baxter (born 1904, date of death unknown) was a Scottish professional footballer who played as a wing half.

Career
Baxter was born in Glasgow, Scotland. He started his career with local team Parkhead, and was part of the team that won the 1923–24 Scottish Junior Cup, beating Baillieston Juniors after a replay. In August 1925, he was signed by English First Division side Leicester City. Making his debut on 24 April 1926, starting in a 4–0 defeat to Bury. Baxter struggled to get first team football, failing to make a single league appearance during the 1926–27 season. He would eventually return to the team in December 1927, starting three consecutive league games. Baxter scored his first on only goal for Leicester on 8 September 1928, coming in a 6–3 defeat to Liverpool at Anfield. Baxter was put on the transfer list by Leicester at the end of the 1928–29 season, and later joined Second Division club Reading.

He failed to make a single appearance for The Royals and ended up leaving after a single season. Baxter was signed by Third Division South club Torquay United in 1930, again failing to make any impact, he then joined newly-formed Boston United. He was a regular starter in the 1934–35 season but retired following 1935–36 season.

Honours
Parkhead
Scottish Junior Cup: 1923–24

Leicester City
First Division: Runners-up 1928–29

Boston United
Lincolnshire Senior Cup: 1934–35

References

1904 births
Footballers from Glasgow
Scottish footballers
Association football wing halves
Parkhead F.C. players
Leicester City F.C. players
Reading F.C. players
Torquay United F.C. players
Boston United F.C. players
Year of death missing